The siege of Baghdad was a fifty-day blockade of Baghdad, the seat of the Abbasid caliphs, in 1136. The siege began when the Seljuk ruler of Iraq, Ghiyath ad-Din Mas'ud, attacked the caliph al-Rashid Billah. During the siege, the populace of Baghdad rose in revolt against the caliph, plundering the Tahirid Palace. In the end, al-Rashid fled the city for Mosul, where he abdicated the caliphate. His uncle, al-Muqtafi, was raised to the throne instead by Mas'ud, who then retired to the east.

References

Sources
 

1136 in Asia
Baghdad 1136
1136
Baghdad 1136
Baghdad 1136
Conflicts in 1136
Wars of succession involving the states and peoples of Asia
Baghdad under the Abbasid Caliphate
12th century in the Abbasid Caliphate